Elizabeth Wooster Stuart Phelps (1815–1852) was an American writer of religiously themed articles, adult domestic fiction and books for children. She wrote eleven books as well as numerous articles and stories that were translated and published in many languages, and probably many more works that appeared anonymously. Phelps wrote "at the beginning of the transition in American women's writing from domestic sentimentality to regional realism" and was "among the earliest depicters of the New England scene, antedating the regional novels of her Andover neighbor, Harriet Beecher Stowe". In addition to being one of the earliest known authors to have penned a fiction series specifically for girls, her writing also focused on the burdens on women in their restrictive roles as mothers and wives. Her much anthologized 1852 semi-autobiographical short story, "The Angel Over the Right Shoulder", illustrates the repressive burdens frustrating a wife's creative ambitions and need to "cultivate her own mind and heart". The story is notable as "one of the rare woman's fictions of this time to recognize the phenomenon of domestic schizophrenia", says literary critic Nina Baym.

Her only daughter and eldest child, the writer Elizabeth Stuart Phelps Ward, noted that her creative and talented mother was "torn" by an internal "civil war" between a woman's calling as caretaker of others and as a creative artist and thinker in her own right. "The struggle killed her", reflected Ward, "but she fought till she fell."

Early life

Phelps was born in Andover, Massachusetts on August 13, 1815, to Moses Stuart and Abigail (Clark) Stuart. Her father was a prominent professor of Sacred Literature at Andover Theological Seminary where he is credited with pioneering modern biblical study in America. He was an anti-abolitionist Christian and he wrote an influential scriptural justification for slavery and for the deportation of black people to Africa in the 1850 pamphlet "Conscience and the Constitution". On her mother's side, the family tree led back to John Winthrop, the English Puritan lawyer and Governor of the Massachusetts Bay Colony. She was also childhood friends with author Harriette Newell Woods Baker, also born in Andover, with whom she started a writing society to read each other's work.

In 1829, at the age of 14, Phelps was among the first class of students to attend the newly opened Abbot Academy, one of the nation's first residential high schools for girls. In 1832, she subsequently enrolled in Boston's Mount Vernon School under the tutelage of its principal Reverend Jacob Abbott, a prolific writer and editor whose works include the popular Rollo books and Lucy books for children. Phelps lived in the Abbott household for two years and while there published her first writings under the pseudonym H. Trusta (an anagram of Stuart) in Abbott's periodical, The Religious Magazine.

After completing her education, Phelps returned to Andover in 1834 suffering from chronic health problems including partial blindness, headaches, and even temporary paralysis. She was diagnosed with a "cerebral disease" or "brain fever" that plagued her for the remainder of her life, possibly a result of that battle she struggled with to comply with what her daughter later termed "the relentless drudgery of domestic toil" while yearning to express her full intellectual and creative mind.

Adult life

She returned to Boston and married Austin Phelps in 1842. Now a prominent minister's wife at the Pine Street Church in Boston, Phelps gave birth to her first child, a daughter baptized Mary Gray (who would adopt her deceased mother's name and become a famous writer in her own right), and lived for six reportedly happy years. In 1848, her husband accepted a position at Andover Theological Seminary alongside his father-in-law, Moses Stuart. In 1849, Phelps began writing the Kitty Brown books, a four-volume religious series, penning one volume per year. After Phelps' death just four years later, Reverend Phelps acknowledged his wife's "foreboding" regarding Andover's oppressiveness for women ("Memorial", p. 74). In those four years, Phelps gave birth to two more children, Moses and Amos, and became a bestselling author with the 1851 publication of The Sunny Side; or, The Country Minister's Wife. The novel sold 100,000 copies in its first year, eventually more than 500,000, and garnered international recognition.

Elizabeth Wooster Stuart Phelps died in Andover on November 30, 1852. Phelps is buried in Phillips Academy Cemetery of Andover, Massachusetts.

Bibliography

 Little Kitty Brown and Her Bible Verses. (1851)
 Kitty Brown and Her City Cousins. (1852)
 Kitty Brown and Her Little School. (1852)
 Kitty Brown Beginning to Think. (1853)
 The Sunny Side and a Peep at Number Five. (1853)
 The Sunny Side; or, The Country Minister's Wife. (1851)
 A Peep at Number Five; or, A Chapter in the Life of a City Pastor. (1852)
 The Angel over the Right Shoulder; or, The Beginning of a New Year. (1852)
 The Tell-Tale; or, Home Secrets told by Old Travellers. (1853)
 Little Mary; or, Talks and Tales for Children. (1854)
 The Last Leaf from Sunnyside. (1853)

References

Further reading

 Articles on Women Writers. Volume 2, 1976–1984: A bibliography. By Narda Lacey Schwartz. Santa Barbara: ABC-CLIO, 1986.
 Chambers's Cyclopaedia of English Literature. A history critical and biographical of authors in the English tongue from the earliest times until the present day with specimens of their writings. Volume III: 19th–20th Century. Edited by David Patrick, revised by J. Liddell Geddie. Philadelphia: J.B. Lippincott, 1938. Use the Index to locate biographies.
 Cyclopaedia of American Literature. Embracing personal and critical notices of authors, and selections from their writings, from the earliest period to the present day; with portraits, autographs, and other illustrations. Volume 1. By Evert A. Duyckinck and George L. Duyckinck. Philadelphia: William Rutter & Co., 1875. Use the Index in Volume 2 to locate biographies.
 Allibone's Critical Dictionary of English Literature. British and American authors living and deceased from the earliest accounts to the latter half of the nineteenth century. Three volumes. By S. Austin Allibone. Philadelphia: J.B. Lippincott, 1858.
 American Authors, 1600–1900. A biographical dictionary of American literature. Edited by Stanley J. Kunitz and Howard Haycraft. Wilson Authors Series. New York: H. W. Wilson Co., 1938.
 American Authors and Books. 1640 to the present day. Third revised edition. By W.J. Burke and Will D. Howe. Revised by Irving Weiss and Anne Weiss. New York: Crown Publishers, 1972.
 American Biographies. By Wheeler Preston. New York: Harper & Brothers Publishers, 1940.
 American Women Writers. A critical reference guide from colonial times to the present. Four volumes. Edited by Lina Mainiero. New York: Frederick Ungar Publishing Co., 1979.
 Appletons' Cyclopaedia of American Biography. Six volumes. Edited by James Grant Wilson and John Fiske. New York: D. Appleton & Co., 1888.
 The Carolyn Sherwin Bailey Historical Collection of Children's Books. A catalogue. Edited and compiled by Dorothy R. Davis. New Haven: Southern Connecticut State College, 1966. Not in strict alphabetic sequence.
 A Dictionary of American Authors. Fifth edition, revised and enlarged. By Oscar Fay Adams. New York: Houghton Mifflin Co., 1904. Biographies are found in the 'Dictionary of American Authors' section which begins on page 1 and in the 'Supplement' which begins on page 441.
 A Dictionary of North American Authors Deceased before 1950. Compiled by W. Stewart Wallace. Toronto: Ryerson Press, 1951.
 Index to Women of the World from Ancient to Modern Times. Biographies and portraits. By Norma Olin Ireland. Westwood: F.W. Faxon Co., 1970.
 Notable American Women, 1607–1950. A biographical dictionary. Three volumes. Edited by Edward T. James. Cambridge: Harvard University Press, Belknap Press, 1971.
 The Oxford Companion to American Literature. Fourth edition. By James D. Hart. New York: Oxford University Press, 1965.
 Pen Names of Women Writers. From 1600 to the present. A compendium of the literary identities of 2,650 women novelists, playwrights, poets, diarists, journalists and miscellaneous writers. By Alice Kahler Marshall. Camp Hill: Alice Kahler Marshall, 1985. 'Alphabetical Listing by Author's Real Name' begins on page 1.
 The Reader's Encyclopedia of American Literature. By Max J. Herzberg. New York: Thomas Y. Crowell Co., 1962.
 The Twentieth Century Biographical Dictionary of Notable Americans. Brief biographies of authors, administrators, clergymen, commanders, editors, engineers, jurists, merchants, officials, philanthropists, scientists, statesmen, and others who are making American history. 10 volumes. Edited by Rossiter Johnson. Boston: The Biographical Society, 1904.
 The Bloomsbury Guide to Women's Literature. Edited by Claire Buck. New York: Prentice Hall General Reference, 1992. Biographies begin on page 247.
 The Oxford Companion to Women's Writing in the United States. Edited by Cathy N. Davidson and Linda Wagner-Martin. New York: Oxford University Press, 1995.

External links

 

1815 births
1852 deaths
American fiction writers
American women children's writers
American children's writers
People from Andover, Massachusetts
Writers from Massachusetts
19th-century American women writers